Town Creek, also known as Old Town Creek or West Fork Tombigbee River, is a tributary stream of the Tombigbee River. Its mouth is approximately two miles east of Amory in northeast Mississippi.

See also
List of rivers of Mississippi

References
. Retrieved 13 June 2005.
. Retrieved 21 May 2008.

Rivers of Mississippi